Ranvendra Pratap Singh (born 3 February 1964) is an Indian politician and a former state minister of Uttar Pradesh.

Early life 
Singh was born on 3 February 1964 to Brajesh Chandra Singh in Fatehpur, Uttar Pradesh. He completed his intermediate studies from Yamuna Christian College in 1981. He married Pushpa Singh on 8 May 1978, with whom he has two sons and two daughters. Singh is an agriculturalist and has a dairy farm.

Political career
He was twice elected to the Uttar Pradesh Legislative Assembly as a Bharatiya Janata Party (BJP) member of the Legislative Assembly: for Khaga in 2007 and for Husainganj in 2017. He was named a minister of state for agriculture, agricultural education and research in the Yogi Adityanath ministry.

Singh lost Husainganj constituency seat to Usha Maurya of Samajwadi party in the 2022 Uttar Pradesh Legislative Assembly election.

References

1964 births
Living people
Bharatiya Janata Party politicians from Uttar Pradesh
Yogi ministry
Uttar Pradesh MLAs 2017–2022
Uttar Pradesh MLAs 2007–2012